Hurcott Lane Cutting is a 0.48 hectare geological Site of Special Scientific Interest in Somerset, notified in 1996.

Sources
 English Nature citation sheet for the site (accessed 9 August 2006)

External links
 English Nature website (SSSI information)

Sites of Special Scientific Interest in Somerset
Sites of Special Scientific Interest notified in 1996
Geology of Somerset
Rail transport in Somerset
Railway cuttings in the United Kingdom